Catherine Walters (13 June 1839 – 5 August 1920), also known as "Skittles", was a fashion trendsetter and one of the last of the great courtesans of Victorian London. Walters' benefactors are rumoured to have included intellectuals, leaders of political parties, aristocrats and a member of the British Royal Family.

Life

Catherine Walters was born on 13 June 1839, the third of five children at 1 Henderson Street, Toxteth, Liverpool, grew up in the Liverpool area and moved to London before her twentieth birthday. Her father was Edward Walters, a customs official, who died in 1864. Her mother was Mary Ann Fowler.

Her nickname is thought to have originated from her working at a bowling alley in Chesterfield Street near Park Lane. (Skittles is the game which evolved into bowling.) At other times, she was known as "Mrs Behrens" and "Mrs Baillie", even though she is not thought to have married.

While not a classical beauty, she was generally considered pretty in her youth, although journalist Nathaniel Gubbins considered she had an "exceedingly plain face". What was undisputed was her "perfect figure" and her skill as a  horsewoman, for which she was almost equally renowned. In the 1860s, the fascinating sight of Walters riding on Rotten Row in Hyde Park drew huge crowds of sightseers. Aristocratic ladies copied the cut of her perfectly fitting "Princess" riding habit, and she was well known as a trendsetter.  

A letter written to The Times in July 1862 described in detail the fever of anticipation among the waiting admirers of a thinly disguised Walters:
"Expectation is raised to its highest pitch: a handsome woman drives rapidly by in a carriage drawn by thoroughbred ponies of surpassing shape and action; the driver is attired in the pork pie hat and the Poole paletot introduced by Anonyma; but alas!, she caused no effect at all, for she is not Anonyma; she is only the Duchess of A–, the Marchioness of B–, the Countess of C–, or some other of Anonyma's many imitators. The crowd, disappointed, reseat themselves, and wait.  Another pony carriage succeeds – and another – with the same depressing result.  At last their patience is rewarded. Anonyma and her ponies appear, and they are satisfied.  She threads her way dexterously, with an unconscious air, through the throng, commented upon by the hundreds who admire and the hundreds who envy her.  She pulls up her ponies to speak to an acquaintance, and her carriage is instantly surrounded by a multitude; she turns and drives back again towards Apsley House, and then away into the unknown world, nobody knows whither".

She counted among her lovers Aubrey de Vere Beauclerk, with whom she eloped for some months to America in the second half of 1862; Spencer Cavendish, Marquess of Hartington (later the eighth Duke of Devonshire), whom she pursued to New York during the American Civil War; Napoléon III; French finance minister Achille Fould; and the Prince of Wales (later King Edward VII). She was also the first love of the poet Wilfrid Scawen Blunt, who remained infatuated with her for the rest of his life.

During her life as a courtesan, Walters's discretion and loyalty to her benefactors became the focal point of her career. There were many rumours about her being involved with certain wealthy men of the time, but she never confirmed or denied these rumours. This gave her great weight in the courtesan lifestyle, and made her a sought-after companion. It also gave long life to her career, and helped her to retire a wealthy woman of society around 1890. Her estate was worth a very considerable £2,764 19s. 6d at her death. As well as her home in Mayfair, which according to DNB she had from 1872, she seems to have had other addresses, judging from a court case in which she was sued for non-payment of a tailoring bill. The other addresses may have been properties she owned. Two were hotels, one in France.

Walters died of a cerebral haemorrhage on 5 August 1920 at her home at 15 South Street, Mayfair, and was buried in the graveyard of the Franciscan Monastery in Crawley, West Sussex.

Cultural references

In 1864, a London publisher, George Vickers, brought out three fictionalised biographies: Anonyma: or, Fair but Frail; Skittles: the Biography of a Fascinating Woman; and Skittles in Paris. The author was possibly William Stephens Hayward, or Bracebridge Hemyng. The open sale (and commercial success) of the biographies caused expressions of moral concern in contemporary newspapers and magazines.

In 1861, Alfred Austin, a future Poet Laureate, referred to 'Skittles' by name in The Season: a Satire, his poem satirising mid-Victorian social mores. He described her dramatic appearance in Rotten Row, and the covert and jealous interest society ladies felt for her. He also suggested that Skittles and other celebrity prostitutes were attractive not merely because they offered sex, but because they were more natural, less repressed and less boring than the well-bred girls who came to London for the marriage 'season'.

Wilfrid Scawen Blunt's poetic sequence The Love Sonnets of Proteus and his later work Esther are thought to be based on his early affair and later friendship with Walters.

The painter Edwin Henry Landseer submitted a picture called The Shrew Tamed for the Royal Academy exhibition of 1861. It showed a beautiful girl in riding habit reclining against the neck of a horse which is on its knees among the straw. It was ostensibly not a portrait of Walters, but the alleged model, the noted horsewoman Annie Gilbert, resembles her, and the juxtaposition of horse, beautiful woman and prevailing mood of languor troubled contemporary critics; some clearly assumed Walters herself had been the subject. The picture gained the alternative title of The Pretty Horsebreaker.

The artist George Finch Mason provided the photograph of her taken in Paris in her mid-twenties that appears in the book Annals of the Billesdon Hunt.

References

Further reading
 Blyth, Henry (1970). Skittles: The Last Victorian Courtesan: The Life and Times of Catherine Walters. London: Rupert Hart-Davis. . .   (snippet view).

External links

 New Scotsman article
 Contemporary reference with image
 Victorian History
 Photograph collection

English courtesans
1839 births
1920 deaths
People from Mayfair
People from Toxteth
Women of the Victorian era
Mistresses of Edward VII